John Frongillo (born October 12, 1939) is a former American football center and guard. He played for the Houston Oilers from 1962 to 1966.

References

1939 births
Living people
American football centers
American football guards
Baylor Bears football players
Houston Oilers players